This is a list of geographical societies

International
EUGEO-Association of Geographical Societies in Europe
European Geography Association
EUROGEO-European Association of Geographers
Gamma Theta Upsilon
International Geographical Union
World Geographers Association

Australia 

 Royal Geographical Society of Queensland
 Royal Geographical Society of South Australia

Belgium
Société Royale Belge de Géographie

Canada
Canadian Association of Geographers
Royal Canadian Geographical Society

Egypt
Egyptian Geographic Society

France
Société de Géographie

Germany
Gesellschaft für Erdkunde zu Berlin

Hong Kong
Hong Kong Geographical Association
Hong Kong Critical Geography Group

Italy
 Società Geografica Italiana

Mexico
Sociedad Mexicana de Geografía y Estadística

Netherlands
Royal Dutch Geographical Society

Norway
Norwegian Geographical Society

Portugal
Lisbon Geographic Society

Saudi Arabia
Saudi Geographical Society

Slovenia
Association of Slovenian Geographers

Russia
Russian Geographical Society

United Kingdom
Geographical Association
Royal Geographical Society
Royal Scottish Geographical Society

United States
American Geographical Society
Association of American Geographers
Association of Pacific Coast Geographers
National Council for Geographic Education
National Geographic Society
Society of Woman Geographers

Geography-related lists
Geographical
Lists of professional associations